Filippo Salviati (1578–1634) was a Catholic prelate who served as Bishop of Sansepolcro (1619–1634).

Biography
Filippo Salviati was born in Florence, Italy in 1578.

He had been Provost of the cathedral Chapter of Prato.

On 12 August 1619, he was appointed Bishop of Sansepolcro by Pope Paul V. On 18 August 1619, he was consecrated bishop by Ottavio Bandini, Cardinal-Priest of San Lorenzo in Lucina, with Francesco Sacrati, Titular Archbishop of Damascus, and Horace Capponi, Bishop Emeritus of Carpentras, serving as co-consecrators.

In Fall 1629, Bishop Salviati conducted a formal visitation of the ecclesiastical institutions in his diocese.

He died in 1634.

References 

17th-century Italian Roman Catholic bishops
Bishops appointed by Pope Paul V
1578 births
1634 deaths